Danny Clinch (born 1964) is an American photographer and film director.

Biography 
Born in Toms River, New Jersey, Clinch graduated from Toms River High School East in 1982. After attending Ocean County College, he attended the New England School of Photography, a two-year institution located in Boston.

Clinch began his career as an intern for Annie Leibovitz, and went on to photograph the likes of Bob Dylan, Johnny Cash, Bruce Springsteen, Tupac Shakur, The Smashing Pumpkins, Blind Melon, Dave Matthews Band, Phish, Nicole Atkins, and Björk. His "unobtrusive" style, according to his bio, is one of the features that Clinch's photographic subjects enjoy.

Clinch's photographs have appeared in publications throughout the world, including Vanity Fair, Spin, The New Yorker, The New York Times, and Rolling Stone. Clinch has presented his work in numerous galleries and published three books: Discovery Inn, When the Iron Bird Flies, Still Moving, and, his most recent, Motor Drive.
In February 2016, Danny was featured on 60 minutes.

In 2003, Clinch founded the film company Three on the Tree Productions, based in New York City. He is also among the 43 noted photographers invited to donate a print to "FOCUS: an auction of the finest photography to benefit City Harvest...." The fund-raiser on September 18, 2008, supports City Harvest, a food collection bank in New York City.

Clinch directed a concert DVD documenting Pearl Jam's 2006 tour of Italy entitled Immagine in Cornice which was released in 2007. In 2013 he directed the video for the band's single Mind Your Manners. He also directed the DVD portion of Springsteen's Devils & Dust DVD box-set, and co-directed the award-winning 2019 film All I Can Say, which was composed of footage shot by late Blind Melon singer Shannon Hoon on his video camera.

Clinch is one of the founders of the Sea.Hear.Now Festival.

Filmography 
 All I Can Say (2019)
 Let's Play Two: Pearl Jam Live at Wrigley Field (2017)
 Leon Bridges This Is Home (2016) This Is Home
 Chris Stapleton Dodge Ram (2016)
 The Avett Brothers February Seven
 Pearl Jam Lightning Bolt (2013)
 I'm in I'm Out and I'm Gone: The Making of Get Up! (2013)
  NY-Z – An ABSOLUT Collaboration with Jay-Z (2010)
  Between the Lines: Sara Bareilles Live at the Fillmore (2008)
 Dispatch: Zimbabwe (2008): Dispatch's most recent concert in the summer of 2007
 John Mayer: Where the Light is (2008)
 Pearl Jam: Immagine in Cornice (2007)
 Foo Fighters: Skin and Bones (2006)
 Specimens of Beauty (2004)
 Guster on Ice: Live from Portland Maine (2004)
 Ani DiFranco: Trust (2004)
 270 Miles from Graceland: Live from Bonnaroo 2003 (2003)
 Brandi Carlile: The Joke (Official Video) from the album By the Way, I Forgive You (2018)
Gov't Mule: Bring On the Music: Live at the Capitol Theatre (2019)

References

External links 
Official website
Official store
Instagram
Twitter
Facebook

Living people
People from Toms River, New Jersey
Ocean County College alumni
Toms River High School East alumni
American photographers
1964 births